The Learning Resource Metadata Initiative (LRMI) is a project led by Creative Commons (CC) and the Association of Educational Publishers (AEP) to establish a common vocabulary for describing learning resources.

External links
 LRMI (official site)
 LRMI (creativecommons.org)

Educational projects
Metadata
Creative Commons